The Jersey All Pro Wrestling (JAPW) Heavyweight Championship is a professional wrestling championship in the American independent professional wrestling promotion Jersey All Pro Wrestling. It became an official title on October 31, 1997 when Joe Rules became the first champion. There have been 35 reigns by 19 wrestlers and six vacancies.

History
The first JAPW Heavyweight Champion was Joe Rules and he won the title on October 31, 1997. He would eliminate Pitbull #2 in a 20-man battle royal to become the champion. But later in the evening Pitbull #2 would defeat Joe Rules for the title after duping him into a match.

After unsuccessfully challenging for the title on a number of occasions, Rhino would finally win it. He would finally win it on January 7, 2006. Rhino would defeat all-comers including Teddy Hart who would start a quest for the JAPW Heavyweight Championship. He would unsuccessfully challenge for the title by losing to Rhino. But due to Rhino no-showing an event, he was subsequently stripped of the title. This left the door open for a new champion to be crowned. Then on November 28, 2006, Hart's quest would come to an end when he defeated Low Ki and Necro Butcher in a triple threat match to win the vacant JAPW Heavyweight Championship. Teddy Hart's title reign would come to an end just under three months later when he would be stripped of the title upon release from the company.

Hart's release from the company would again leave the title vacant. The title would remain vacant from January 23, 2007 - March 17, 2007 when Low Ki would win his second JAPW Heavyweight Championship when he defeated Rhino in an eight-man gauntlet match to win the vacant title. Other participants in the match were Chris Hero, Ruckus, Delirious, Davey Richards, EC Negro, Human Tornado.

Title History

Names

Reigns

Combined reigns

See also
JAPW New Jersey State Championship
JAPW Light Heavyweight Championship

References

External links
JAPW Heavyweight Championship Title History

Heavyweight
Heavyweight wrestling championships
Sports in Hudson County, New Jersey